A number of world records and Olympic records were set in various events at the 1996 Summer Olympics in Atlanta, United States.

Records by sport

Cycling

OR = Olympic record, WR = World record

Swimming

Men

Women

Athletics

Men 
Note: Any world record is also an Olympic record

Women 

Sources

References

1996 Summer Olympics
1996 Summer Olympics